Midian is an unincorporated community in Butler County, Kansas, United States.

History
A post office was opened in Midian in 1918, and remained in operation until it was discontinued in 1950.

Education
The community is served by Circle USD 375 public school district.

References

Further reading

External links
 Butler County maps: Current, Historic, KDOT

Unincorporated communities in Butler County, Kansas
Unincorporated communities in Kansas